Mississippi Highway 614 (MS 614) is a  east–west state highway in northeastern Jackson County, Mississippi. It connects the communities of Wade and Hurley with the Alabama state line and the city of Mobile.

Route description 

MS 614 begins in the community of Wade at an intersection with MS 63; the road continues west as Wade–Vancleave Road to cross the Pascagoula River and connect to the community of Vancleave and MS 57. It heads northeast to leave Wade and travel through woodlands for a few miles to pass through the community of Hurley, where it has a junction with MS 613 at the main crossroads at the center of town. The highway leaves Hurley and heads southeast through farmland for several miles, where it crosses the Escatawpa River before curving back northeastward for a couple miles to come to the Alabama state line. MS 614 comes to an end and the roadway continues east as CR 56 (Airport Boulevard) into the city of Mobile.

The entire length of Mississippi Highway 614 is a rural two-lane highway.

Major intersections

References

External links

614
Transportation in Jackson County, Mississippi